Jarrod Cunningham (7 September 1968 – 23 July 2007) was a New Zealand rugby union fullback. Born in Hawke's Bay, Cunningham played for his home town rugby club from 1990 to 1997, during which time he was trialed for the All Blacks in 1993, but was kept out of the side by Andrew Mehrtens. He played Super 12 rugby for Auckland Blues in 1996, and then Wellington Hurricanes in the 1997/98 season. In July 1998, he joined English Premiership Rugby side London Irish, playing 82 games and scoring 18 tries and 848 points. In the 2000/1 season he was the leagues leading points scorer, with 324.

After tests at Charing Cross Hospital, Cunningham was diagnosed with suffering from amyotrophic lateral sclerosis (ALS; also known as Lou Gehrig's disease), in June 2002. He immediately retired from professional rugby, and started the Jarrod Cunningham SALSA Foundation in March 2003 with the aim of providing hope, education and inspiration for fellow sufferers of ALS. In November 2004 he was awarded the IRB Spirit of Rugby award in recognition of his work in raising awareness of the disease. He returned home to New Zealand in December 2004. He died at his home on 23 July 2007.

References

External links 
Report of death and short career history at London Irish
 Interview with Jarrod Cunningham

1968 births
2007 deaths
Deaths from motor neuron disease
Neurological disease deaths in New Zealand
London Irish players
Wasps RFC players
New Zealand rugby union players
Rugby union fly-halves
Rugby union fullbacks
Hawke's Bay rugby union players
Hurricanes (rugby union) players
New Zealand expatriate rugby union players
Expatriate rugby union players in England
New Zealand expatriate sportspeople in England
Rugby union players from the Hawke's Bay Region